Joseph W. Jourdan served in the California legislature and was born in Australia.

References

Members of the California State Legislature
Australian emigrants to the United States